The fifth series of the British medical drama television series Casualty commenced airing in the United Kingdom on BBC One on 7 September 1990 and finished on 7 December 1990.

Cast

Overview
The fifth series of Casualty features a cast of characters working in the emergency department of Holby City Hospital. The series began with 6 roles with star billing. Derek Thompson continues his role as charge nurse Charlie Fairhead, Cathy Shipton stars as sister Lisa "Duffy" Duffin, and Brenda Fricker appears as state enrolled nurse Megan Roach. Geoffrey Leesley and Ian Bleasdale portrays paramedics Keith Cotterill and Josh Griffiths, while Robson Green plays porter Jimmy Powell.

Nigel Le Vaillant, Mamta Kaash, Patrick Robinson, Maggie McCarthy and Eamon Boland joined the cast in episode one as registrar Julian Chapman, senior house officer Beth Ramanee, staff nurse Martin "Ash" Ashford, receptionist Helen Green and social worker Tony Walker. Caroline Webster debuted in episode two as paramedic Jane Scott. Boland left the series in episode ten and McCarthy departed in episode fifteen. Leesley and Fricker chose to leave the series after four years and five years on the show respectively. Leesley made his final appearance in episode five and Fricker departed in episode thirteen.

Main characters 

Eamon Boland as Tony Walker (episodes 1−10)
Ian Bleasdale as Josh Griffiths
Brenda Fricker as Megan Roach (until episode 13)
Robson Green as Jimmy Powell
Mamta Kaash as Beth Ramanee (from episode 1)

Nigel Le Vaillant as Julian Chapman (from episode 1)
Maggie McCarthy as Helen Green (episodes 1−15)

Cathy Shipton as Lisa "Duffy" Duffin
Derek Thompson as Charlie Fairhead
Caroline Webster as Jane Scott (from episode 2)

Guest characters
Doreen Mantle as Kate Duffin (episodes 8−9)

Episodes

References

External links
 Casualty series 5 at the Internet Movie Database

05
1990 British television seasons